The Nimda virus is a malicious file-infecting computer worm. It quickly spread, surpassing the economic damage caused by previous outbreaks such as Code Red.

The first released advisory about this thread (worm) was released on September 18, 2001. Due to the release date, exactly one week after the attacks on the World Trade Center and Pentagon, some media quickly began speculating a link between the virus and Al Qaeda, though this theory ended up proving unfounded.

Nimda affected both user workstations (clients) running Windows 95, 98, NT, 2000, or XP and servers running Windows NT and 2000.

The worm's name comes from the reversed spelling of "admin".

F-Secure found the text "Concept Virus(CV) V.5, Copyright(C)2001 R.P.China" in the Nimda code, suggesting its country of origin. However, they also noted that a computer in Canada was responsible for an October 11, 2001 release of infected emails alleging to be from Mikko Hyppönen and Data Fellows (F-Secure's previous name).

Methods of infection
Nimda proved effective partially because it—unlike other infamous malware like  Code Red—uses five different infection vectors:
 Email
 Open network shares
 Browsing of compromised web sites
 Exploitation of various Internet Information Services (IIS) 4.0 / 5.0 directory traversal vulnerabilities. (Both Code Red and Nimda were hugely successful exploiting well known and long solved vulnerabilities in the Microsoft IIS Server.)
 Back doors left behind by the "Code Red II" and "sadmind/IIS" worms.

See also
 Mixed threat attack
 Timeline of notable computer viruses and worms

References

External links
 Cert advisory on Nimda
 Antivirus vendor F-Secure's info on Nimda

Exploit-based worms
Windows file viruses
Hacking in the 2000s
2001 in computing